Nathaniel Boyd (July 9, 1853 – November 9, 1941) was a Canadian politician.

Born in Lachute, Canada East, the son of Hugh Boyd and Maria Kilfoyle, Boyd attended common schools in Oxford County, Leeds and Grenville and studied at the Grammar School in Ottawa. After school, he worked with his father in railroad contracting and spent time working in telegraphy. He moved to Manitoba and worked as the chief train dispatcher and assistant superintendent for the Canadian Pacific Railway in Manitoba. Afterwards, he started a wholesale and retail lumber business in Winnipeg called Boyd and Crowe, which operated in the Point Douglas district of Winnipeg.

He first ran as the Conservative candidate for the House of Commons of Canada for the riding of Marquette in the 1891 federal election but was defeated. He was acclaimed in an 1892 by-election resulting from the resignation of the sitting MP, Robert Watson. He was re-elected in 1896 for the riding of Macdonald. The election was declared void in 1897 and Boyd did not run in the resulting by-election. He did run and win again in 1900 election and was defeated in 1904 election this time for the riding of Portage la Prairie.

He died at the age of 88 in 1941.

References
 
 

1853 births
1941 deaths
Conservative Party of Canada (1867–1942) MPs
Members of the House of Commons of Canada from Manitoba